Rahim Beqiri (1 January 1957 – 2 August 2001), or better known as Komandant Roki, was an army commander in the KLA during the Kosovo War of the late 1998s. He was born in Koprivnica, Autonomous Province of Kosovo and Metohija.

At the start of the War in Kosovo, he joined the Kosovo Liberation Army (KLA) in the role of a commander of the Marec operative zone. Afterwards he joined the UÇPMB in the Preševo Valley Conflict, and after the beginning of the Macedonian Conflict in 2001 he joined the NLA and infiltrates the Kosovo-Macedonian border, where he started attacking the Macedonian security forces. He was one of the commanders of the 112 Brigade of the NLA, which is active in the Tetovo area. He was wounded by the Macedonian security forces a clash at the Drenovec suburb, during the Second Battle for Tetovo. He was immediately transferred to the hospital in Poroj, and then in the Prishtina hospital, where he died on 2 August 2001.

See also
Kosovo War
Preševo Valley conflict
Macedonian Conflict

References

Kosovo Liberation Army soldiers
1957 births
2001 deaths
2001 insurgency in Macedonia
Albanian nationalists
20th-century Albanian military personnel